In the U.S. state of Nevada, U.S. Route 93 Alternate (US 93 Alt. or Alt 93) is an alternate route of U.S. Route 93 located in the northeast part of the state. It connects Lages Station to Wells via the town of West Wendover.

Route description

US 93 Alt. begins at Lages Station in northern White Pine County. As mainline US 93 proceeds north, Alt 93 heads more northeast, entering Elko County shortly after leaving the junction. The route continues northeast, passing through the Antelope Range and the Goshute Mountains, where it ascends White Horse Pass (elevation ). Descending the pass, US 93 Alternate turns more northward to follow the base of the Goshute Mountains towards West Wendover.

Entering West Wendover, US 93 Alt. intersects Wendover Boulevard (Interstate 80 Business). US 93 Alt. comes to an end in the city of Wells, reuniting with mainline US 93 at the I-80 East Wells interchange (exit 352).

History
US 93 Alt. has origins dating back to the early auto trails. The portion of the route between Lages Station and West Wendover was originally part of the Lincoln Highway, the first road across America. This segment was originally designated as a portion of US 50. When the US highway system was developed in 1926 the routing of US 50 followed what is now US 93 between Ely and Lages Station and then continued on to West Wendover. From there, it followed US 40 (now Interstate 80) east across the Great Salt Lake Desert in Utah, through Salt Lake City, south along US 91 (now Interstate 15) to Provo, Utah. This designation remained until approximately 1952, when it was redesignated US 50 Alternate. Utah decommissioned portions of Alt 50 in 1972.

US 93 Alt. was established by the American Association of State Highway and Transportation Officials (AASHTO) at their annual meeting on November 12, 1976. Action at this meeting eliminated the former Alt 50 designation between Nevada and Utah, applying Alt 93 over the portion of Alt 50 not already overlapping US 93 mainline then returning the new route to the US 93 mainline via Interstate 80. AASHTO approved the route as a "Temporary Alternate". However, the route remains designated today and is not signed as a temporary routing.

Major intersections
Mileposts in Nevada reset at county lines; the start and end mileposts for each county are given in the county column.  Mileposts are given only for those portions of US 93 Alt not concurrent with Interstate 80.

See also

References

93 Alternate
Alternate (Nevada)
93 Alternate (Nevada)
Transportation in White Pine County, Nevada
Transportation in Elko County, Nevada
West Wendover, Nevada